Fausto Pizzi (born 21 July 1967) is an Italian former professional footballer who played as a midfielder. Since 2011, he has managed Parma F.C.'s most senior youth team.

Playing career
Pizzi was born in Rho. He started his career at Inter and spent the first five years of his career on loan, including one spell at Parma. He subsequently struggled to break into Inter's first team on a regular basis and moved to Parma in 1992, where he spent one year. He retired in 2005.

Managerial career
On 21 June 2011, Pizzi became the head coach of Parma's under-20 team, the primavera. He replaced Tiziano De Patre, who had decided to move to another team to pursue a senior coaching post. Pizzi had coached other Parma youth sides after joining the club in 2007.

Honours
Inter
 UEFA Cup: 1990–91

Parma
 UEFA Cup Winners' Cup: 1992–93

References

1967 births
Living people
People from Rho, Lombardy
Association football midfielders
Italian footballers
Serie A players
Serie B players
Serie C players
Inter Milan players
L.R. Vicenza players
Parma Calcio 1913 players
Udinese Calcio players
S.S.C. Napoli players
A.C. Perugia Calcio players
Genoa C.F.C. players
U.S. Cremonese players
Treviso F.B.C. 1993 players
A.S. Cittadella players
A.C. Reggiana 1919 players
A.S.D. Victor San Marino players
Italian football managers
UEFA Cup winning players
Footballers from Lombardy
Sportspeople from the Metropolitan City of Milan